95th Street/Chicago State University is an electrified commuter rail station along Metra Electric's main line on the northeast corner of Chicago State University in Chicago, Illinois.

Like much of the main branch of the Metra Electric line, 95th Street-CSU is built on elevated tracks near the embankment of a bridge over 95th Street. This bridge also carries the Amtrak line that runs parallel to it, carrying the City of New Orleans, Illini, and Saluki trains. In addition the line, which is owned by Canadian National Railway has a connection to the Norfolk Southern Railway which crosses over the tracks as well as Cottage Grove Avenue, between Lyon and Burnside Avenues.

In April 2004, the Chicago State University master plan called for a new station south of the existing one. On August 1, 2019, it was announced that Metra and Chicago State University would substantially renovate the station. The work will consist of a new platform, stair enclosure, an elevator and at least one on-demand heater. The completion of the work would lead to regularly scheduled stops.

Bus connections
CTA
  4 Cottage Grove 
  N5 South Shore Night Bus 
  95 95th 
  100 Jeffery Manor Express (weekday rush hours only) 
  115 Pullman/115th

References

External links 

95th Street entrance from Google maps Street View

Metra stations in Chicago
Railway stations in Illinois at university and college campuses
Former Illinois Central Railroad stations
Chicago State University